The 2010 FIFA U-17 Women's World Cup women's football tournament is the second such tournament, and was held in Trinidad and Tobago from 5 to 25 September 2010. Sixteen teams, comprising representatives from all six confederations, took part in the final competition, in which Trinidad and Tobago had a guaranteed place as the host nation.

Qualified teams
The qualifiers took place during late 2009 and early 2010. The places were allocated as follows to confederations: AFC (3), CAF (3), CONCACAF (2), CONMEBOL (3), OFC (1), UEFA (3), plus the host country.

1.Teams that made their debut.

On 30 June 2010, President of Nigeria Goodluck Jonathan announced he would suspend the Nigeria Football Federation from FIFA competition for 2 years. This put the Flamingoes place at the competition in jeopardy. On 5 July 2010, the ban was lifted.

Squads

Venues
During preparation four stadia were constructed in 2001. These four venues along with Hasely Crawford Stadium in Port of Spain, Trinidad are the venues for the women's competition.

Group stage
The opening phase of the tournament comprised four groups of four teams, with the top two sides in each section advancing to the quarter-finals. The final draw to determine the groups took place in Port of Spain, Trinidad and Tobago on 5 May 2010.

Tie breakers in the group stage are:
 greatest number of points obtained in all group matches
 goal difference in all group matches
 greatest number of goals scored in all group matches
If more than two or more teams are still tied after that:
 greatest number of points obtained in matches between concerned teams
 goal difference in matches between concerned teams
 greatest number of goals scored in matches between concerned teams
 fair play point system, in which the yellow and red cards of group matches are evaluated
 drawing of lots

Group A

Match times are local time (UTC−4).

Group B

Match times are local time (UTC−4).

Group C

Match times are local time (UTC−4).

Group D

Match times are local time (UTC−4).

Knockout stage

Quarterfinals

Semifinals

3rd Place Playoff

Final

Winners

Awards

Goal scorers
8 goals
 Yeo Min-ji

7 goals
 Kyra Malinowski

6 goals
 Kumi Yokoyama
 Loveth Ayila

5 goals
 Lena Petermann
 Ngozi Okobi
 Kim Kum-jong

4 goals
 Lena Lotzen
 Yōko Tanaka

3 goals

 Francisca Ordega
 Mai Kyokawa
 Paloma Lázaro
 Raquel Pinel

2 goals

 Glaucia
 Melanie Leupolz
 Siobhán Killeen
 Hikaru Naomoto
 Kim A-reum
 Fernanda Piña
 Kate Loye
 Kim Su-Gyong
 Jermaine Seoposenwe
 Liana Hinds
 Ysaura Viso

1 goal

 Paula
 Thaís
 Haisha Cantave
 Iona Rothfeld
 Nagore Calderón
 Laura Gutiérrez
 Gema Gili
 Sara Merida
 Iraia Pérez
 Alexia Putellas
 Amanda Sampedro
 Silvana Chojnowski
 Kristin Demann
 Isabella Schmid
 Alice Danso
 Megan Campbell
 Stacie Donnelly
 Aileen Gilroy
 Denise O'Sullivan
 Yuka Honda
 Chika Katō
 Hikari Nagashima
 Mina Tanaka
 Hikari Takagi
 Kim Da-hye
 Lee So-dam
 Shin Dam-yeong
 Lee Jung-eun
 Lee Yoo-na
 Kim Na-ri
 Lee Geum-min
 Joo Soo-jin
 Christina Murillo
 Andrea Sánchez
 Daniela Solís
 Winifred Eyebhoria
 Pong Son-Hwa
 Diarra Simmons
 Anna Alvarado

Own goal
 Jermaine Seoposenwe (against Germany)
 Ivana Andres (against Brazil)

References

External links
FIFA U-17 Women's World Cup Trinidad & Tobago 2010 , FIFA.com
FIFA Technical Report

FIFA
2010
2010–11 in Trinidad and Tobago football
2010
2010 in youth sport
September 2010 sports events in North America
2010 in youth association football